The 1960 Giro d'Italia was the 43rd edition of the Giro d'Italia, one of cycling's Grand Tours. The field consisted of 140 riders, and 97 riders finished the race.

By rider

By nationality

References

1960 Giro d'Italia
1960